The Hindu Inheritance (Removal of Disabilities) Act, 1928 was enacted to abolish the exclusion from inheritance of certain classes of heirs, and to remove certain doubts regarding their ability to inherit property. The Act specifies that persons who are diseased, deformed or physically or mentally handicapped cannot be disqualified from their right to own or share joint-family property unless the law specifies otherwise. This Act essentially abolishes the ancient Hindu legal practice that those who are handicapped are ineligible to inherit property from their family.

References

Hindu law
Indian family law
1928 in law
1928 in India
Legislation in British India
1928 in British law